Rural development is the process of improving the quality of life and economic well-being of people living in rural areas, often relatively isolated and sparsely populated areas.

Rural development has traditionally centered on the exploitation of land-intensive natural resources such as agriculture and forestry. However, changes in global production networks and increased urbanization have changed the character of rural areas. Increasingly rural tourism, niche manufacturers, and recreation have replaced resource extraction and agriculture as dominant economic drivers.  The need for rural communities to approach development from a wider perspective has created more focus on a broad range of development goals rather than merely creating incentive for agricultural or resource-based businesses. 

Education, entrepreneurship, physical infrastructure, and social infrastructure all play an important role in developing rural regions.  Rural development is also characterized by its emphasis on locally produced economic development strategies.   In contrast to urban regions, which have many similarities, rural areas are highly distinctive from one another. For this reason there are a large variety of rural development approaches used globally.

Approaches to development 
Rural development actions are intended to further the social and economic development of rural communities.

Rural development programs were historically top-down approaches from local or regional authorities, regional development agencies, NGOs, national governments or international development organizations.  However, a critical 'organization gap' identified during the late 1960s, reflecting on the disjunction between national organizations and rural communities led to a great focus on community participation in rural development agendas. Oftentimes this was achieved through political decentralization policies in developing countries, particularly popular among African countries, or policies that shift the power of socio-politico-economic decision-making and the election of representatives and leadership from centralized governments to local governments. As a result, local populations can also bring about endogenous initiatives for development. The term rural development is not limited to issues of developing countries. In fact many developed countries have very active rural development programs.

Rural development aims at finding ways to improve rural lives with the participation of rural people themselves, so as to meet the required needs of rural communities. The outsider may not understand the setting, culture, language and other things prevalent in the local area. As such, rural people themselves have to participate in their sustainable rural development. In developing countries like Nepal, Pakistan, India, Bangladesh, integrated development approaches are being followed up. In this context, many approaches and ideas have been developed and implemented, for instance, bottom-up approaches, PRA- Participatory Rural Appraisal, RRA- Rapid Rural Appraisal, Working With People (WWP), etc. The New Rural Reconstruction Movement in China has been actively promoting rural development through their ecological farming projects.

The role of NGOs/non-profits in developing countries 
Because decentralization policies made development problems the responsibility of local governments, it also opened the door for non-governmental organizations (NGOs), nonprofits, and other foreign actors to become more involved in the approach to these issues. For example, the elimination of statist approaches to development caused an exponential increase in the number of NGOs active in Africa, and additionally caused them to take on increasingly important roles.  Consequently, nonprofits and NGOs are also greatly involved in the provisioning of needs in developing countries and they play an increasingly large role in supporting rural development.

These organizations are often criticized for taking over responsibilities that are traditionally carried out by the state, causing governments to become ineffective in handling these responsibilities over time. Within Africa, NGOs carry out the majority of sustainable building and construction through donor-funded, low-income housing projects.  Furthermore, they are often faulted for being easily controlled by donor money and oriented to serve the needs of local elites above the rest of the population. As a result of this critique, many NGOs have started to include strategies in their projects that promote community participation.

Many scholars argue that NGOs are an insufficient solution to a lack of development leadership as a result of decentralization policies. Human rights expert Susan Dicklitch points to the historical context of colonialism, organization-specific limitations, and regime restraints as hindrances to the promises of NGOs. She notes that “NGOs are increasingly relegated to service provision and gap-filling activities as by the retreating state, but those supportive functions are not matched with increased political efficacy”.

International most examples

Rural development in Uganda 
In Uganda specifically, several mid-century centrist administrations, particularly the regimes of Idi Amin (1971-1979) and Milton Obote (1981-1986), described as brutal and ineffective led to a sharp drop in responsiveness to citizen’s needs between 1966 and 1986. As a result of these administrations, several constraints were placed on local governments that prevented effective development initiatives: every single employee in local governments had to be appointed by the president, all local budgets and bylaws had to be approved by the Minister of Local Government, and this Minister could dissolve any local government council.

Because of the several shortcomings of the dictatorial government in promoting the participation of citizens in local development efforts, a decentralization campaign was officially launched in Uganda in 1992, with its legislative culmination occurring in 1997 with the passing of the Local Governments Act. This act led to the transfer of power to local governments in an attempt to encourage citizen participation and further rural development. Regarding funding under the decentralization structure, local governments receive a majority of their funds in block grants from the national government, mostly as conditional grants but with some unconditional and equalization grants administered as well. Furthermore, local governments were given the power to collect taxes from their constituents, however, this usually only accounts for less than 10 percent of the local government’s budget.

Debates in decentralization efforts in Uganda 

Some scholars express concern that decentralization efforts in Uganda may not actually be leading to an increase in participation and development. For example, despite increases over the years in local councils and civil society organizations (CSOs) in rural Uganda, efforts are consistently undermined by a lacking socio-economic structure leading to high rates of illiteracy, poor agricultural techniques, market access, and transportation systems. These shortcomings are often a result of taxes and payments imposed by local authorities and administration agents that inhibit farmers' access to larger markets.  Furthermore, the overall financial strength of local governments is considerably weaker than that of the national government, which adversely affects their responsiveness to the needs of their citizens and success in increasing participation in community development initiatives. Finally, civil society organizations are often ineffective in practice at mobilizing for the community’s interests. Dr. Umar Kakumba, a scholar at Makerere University in Uganda, notes of CSOs:The CSOs’ inability to effectively mobilize for and represent the local community’s interests is linked to the disabling regulatory environment with cumbersome and elaborate procedures for registration and restrictions on what constitutes allowable advocacy activities; their desire to complement the work of government rather than questioning it; the difficulties in raising adequate resources from their membership; the inability to exercise internal democracy and accountability; the urban/elite orientation of most NGOs; and the donor funding that encourages a number of CSOs to emerge in order to clinch a share of the donor monies.

Nigeria

Rural development agencies 

In many countries, the national and subnational government delegates rural development to agencies and support centers.

List of agencies 
 International Institute of Rural Reconstruction
 Technical Centre for Agricultural and Rural Cooperation ACP-EU (CTA) Agricultural and rural information provider
 USDA Rural Development, an agency of the United States Department of Agriculture
 European Agricultural Fund for Rural Development, a part of the Common Agricultural Policy by the European Commission's Directorate-General for Agriculture and Rural Development
 England Rural Development Programme by DEFRA
 Agricultural Development & Training Society, India
 Ministry of Villages, Development of Disadvantaged Regions, and Transmigration, Indonesia
 Tipperary Institute, Ireland
 Azerbaijan Rural Investment Project in Azerbaijan
 Nimbkar Agricultural Research Institute, India
 Philippine Rural Reconstruction Movement, Philippines

See also 

 Comilla Project, the first comprehensive rural development project in developing countries
 Development studies
 District Rural Development Agencies (India)
 International Fund for Agricultural Development (IFAD)
 Regional development
 RIGA Project
 Rural flight
 Rural sociology
 Rural management
 Urban development

References

External links 
  Transforming the Rural Nonfarm Economy: Opportunities and Threats in the Developing World Edited by Steven Haggblade, Peter B. R. Hazell, and Thomas Reardon (2007), Johns Hopkins University Press
 CNN - For Rural Women, Land Means Hope, The George Foundation
 Research on Agriculture and Rural Development  from the Overseas Development Institute
 European Network for Rural Development